Texas Creek may refer to:

Waterways
Texas Creek (Fraser River), British Columbia, Canada
Texas Creek (Christina Lake), British Columbia, Canada
Texas Creek (Pennsylvania), a tributary of Little Pine Creek, United States

Communities
Texas Creek, Colorado, a populated place in Colorado, United States

See also